The Frontbench Team of Stephen Flynn is the team of Scottish National Party Spokespersons in the House of Commons since 2022. The frontbench was appointed on 10 December 2022.

Flynn was elected leader of the SNP Westminster Group on 6 December 2022, alongside Black's election as deputy leader, following the resignation of Ian Blackford. Flynn's leadership comes at a time of a cost of living crisis while the United Kingdom's Supreme Court has set out that the Scottish Parliament does not have the devolved competence to hold an independence referendum without the consent of the British Government.

First Minister Nicola Sturgeon has set out plans for the next election to the House of Commons to be a proxy referendum on independence, putting the Frontbench Team at the centre of a constitutional campaign within Scotland.

Formation 
After Flynn's victory in the leadership election, Pete Wishart, Chris Law and Stewart McDonald resigned from the frontbench.

Members

Frontbench

References 
2022 establishments in the United Kingdom

2022 in British politics
2022 in the United Kingdom
British shadow cabinets
Scottish National Party